The Adventurous Wedding is a 1925 German silent film directed by Franz Seitz and starring Hans Unterkircher, Maria Mindzenty and Alice Hechy.

The film's art direction was by Ludwig Reiber and Otto Völckers. It was shot at the Emelka Studios in Munich.

Cast
 Hans Unterkircher as Sir Henry Lie
 Maria Mindzenty as Mary Wood
 Alice Hechy as Ruth
 Carl Walther Meyer as Frank Carabin
 John Mylong as Fergus
 Josef Berger as Samuel

References

External links

1925 films
Films of the Weimar Republic
Films directed by Franz Seitz
German silent feature films
Bavaria Film films
German black-and-white films
Films shot at Bavaria Studios